The gray-lined hawk (Buteo nitidus) is a smallish raptor found in open country and forest edges. It is sometimes placed in the genus Asturina as Asturina nitida. The species has been split by the American Ornithological Society from the gray hawk. The gray-lined hawk is found from El Salvador to Argentina, as well as on the Caribbean island of Trinidad.

Description 
The adult has a pale gray body, the tail is black with three white bands and the legs are orange. It has fine white barring on the upper parts.
Immature birds have dark brown upperparts, a pale-banded brown tail, brown-spotted white underparts and a brown streaked buff head and neck. This species is quite short-winged, and has a fast agile flight for a Buteo.

Diet 
It feeds mainly on lizards and snakes, but will also take insects (such as beetles and grasshoppers), small mammals (such as rabbits, squirrels and mice), birds (such as quails and nestling doves), frogs, toads, other amphibians and fish. It usually sits on an open high perch from which it swoops on its prey, but will also hunt from a low glide.

Breeding 
The nest is of sticks and built high in a tree. The usual clutch is one to three, usually two white to pale blue eggs. The young take about 6 weeks to fledging.

References

 Baillie, J.E.M.; Hilton-Taylor, C. & Stuart, S.N. (eds.) (2004): 2004 IUCN Red List of Threatened Species. A Global Species Assessment. IUCN, Gland, Switzerland and Cambridge, UK. 
 ffrench, Richard; O'Neill, John Patton & Eckelberry, Don R. (1991): A guide to the birds of Trinidad and Tobago (2nd edition). Comstock Publishing, Ithaca, N.Y.. 
 Hilty, Steven L. (2003): Birds of Venezuela. Christopher Helm, London. 
 Stiles, F. Gary & Skutch, Alexander Frank (1989): A guide to the birds of Costa Rica. Comistock, Ithaca. 
 Full text via BioOne. (Asturina merged into Buteo, citing Riesing, et al. 2003.) 
 Riesing, M. J., L. Kruckenhauser, A. Gamauf, and E. Haring. 2003. Molecular phylogeny of the genus Buteo (Aves: Accipitridae) based on mitochondrial marker sequences. Molecular Phylogenetics and Evolution 27:328–342.

Buteo
Birds of prey
Birds of Central America
Birds of South America
Birds of Trinidad and Tobago
Birds of the Caribbean
Gray-lined hawk
Gray-lined hawk